Kim Myong-won (born 15 July 1983) is a North Korean international footballer, who plays as a striker for FC Ulaanbaatar in the Mongolia Premier League. Known for his blazing speed, he's known in North Korea as The Chariot.

International career 
Kim has played on nine occasions for the North Korean national team since his first appearance in 2003, and has been called up to their 23-man squad for the 2010 FIFA World Cup. Nevertheless, he was registered as one of the three goalkeepers as all the squads must nominate three eligible keepers for the tournament. Coach Kim Jong-hun did this to boost his attacking options, but FIFA revealed that Kim would only be allowed to play as a goalkeeper, and not as an outfield player as had originally been intended. It has also been reported that he actually played as a goalkeeper for his club at least once, showing skills especially in saving penalties.

References

External links 
 
 
 
 Kim Myong-won at DPRKFootball

1983 births
Living people
North Korean footballers
North Korean expatriate footballers
Association football goalkeepers
North Korea international footballers
Association football forwards
Expatriate footballers in Mongolia
Amnokgang Sports Club players
2010 FIFA World Cup players
Footballers at the 2006 Asian Games
Asian Games competitors for North Korea